Ulan Abirbekuly Konysbayev (Ūlan Äbırbekūly Qonysbaev; born 28 May 1989) is a Kazakh footballer who plays for Taraz in the Kazakhstan Premier League.

Career
Konysbayev began his career in 2006 with FC Zhambyl.
Konysbayev left FC Shakhter Karagandy at the end of the 2014 season.

In February 2016, Konysbayev signed for FC Atyrau.

Career statistics

Club

International

International goals

Honours

Club
Astana
 Kazakhstan Cup (1): 2012
 Kazakhstan Super Cup (2): 2011, 2015

Shakhter Karagandy
 Kazakhstan Premier League (1): 2011

Individual
 Kazakhstani Footballer of the Year: 2011

References

External links
 
 
 FFK Profile

1989 births
Living people
Sportspeople from Oskemen
Association football midfielders
Kazakhstani footballers
Kazakhstan international footballers
Kazakhstan under-21 international footballers
Kazakhstan Premier League players
FC Astana players
FC Shakhter Karagandy players
FC Taraz players
FC Kairat players
FC Atyrau players